Jeffery Lee Smith (born May 25, 1973) is a former professional American football offensive lineman in the National Football League. He played for the Kansas City Chiefs (1996–1999), the Jacksonville Jaguars (2000–2001), and the Pittsburgh Steelers (2002).

1973 births
Living people
People from Meigs County, Tennessee
Players of American football from Tennessee
American football centers
American football offensive guards
Tennessee Volunteers football players
Kansas City Chiefs players
Jacksonville Jaguars players
Pittsburgh Steelers players